KPTN may refer to:

 KPTN-LD, a low-power television station (channel 19, virtual 7) licensed to serve St. Louis, Missouri, United States
 Harry P. Williams Memorial Airport (ICAO code KPTN)
 Kaptin (actin binding protein), human gene